CTPP (or CT++) is a template engine completely written in C++. It has bindings for Perl, PHP and Python languages.

Features 
 Performance
 Flexible syntax of templates
 Robustness
 Portability
 Support for implementations in the language of your choice
 Unlimited levels of nested cycles and conditions
 User functions

Architecture 

The MVC paradigm divides an application into three basic entities: a set of Models, a Controller, and the View.

A classic implementation completely isolates these entities from each other. It is assumed that a View does not process any data and only renders a corresponding object model according to the template, that a Controller is only used to determine the list of executed models, and that Models represent entirely abstract data sets and rules that govern the data.

This paradigm allows separating the functions of a web designer, a programmer and a manager. A lot of the code can be reused. In addition a project has a single entry point which facilitates its upgrading and development.

As represented in the diagram below the architecture of the template engine consists of 4 subsystems: a template compiler which converts the text of the page template into bytecode, a virtual machine which executes the bytecode, a caching system for templates, and a library of data processor functions.

External links 
  (BROKEN) (Version cached in Web Archive)
 

C++ libraries
Perl modules
PHP
Scripting languages
Template engines